Anolis richardii, commonly known as the Grenada tree anole or Richard's anole, is a species of anole lizard in the family Dactyloidae. The species is found in the Caribbean.

Etymology
The specific name, richardii, is in honor of French botanist Louis Claude Marie Richard.

Geographic range
A. richardii is native to Grenada and the Grenadines islands, and it has been introduced to Tobago.

Description
A. richardsii is large for an anole, with males reaching a maximum length of  snout-to-vent.  It has a dark green or brown dorsal surface, with a green-gray to yellow ventral surface.  Its dewlap is orange, yellow, or gray-green.  Females and juveniles often have a yellow or cream-colored lateral stripe.

References

External links
Anolis richardii at the Encyclopedia of Life.
Anolis richardii at the Reptile Database.

Further reading
Boulenger, G.A. (1885). Catalogue of the Lizards in the British Museum (Natural History). Second Edition. Volume II. Iguanidæ ... London: Trustees of the British Museum (Natural History). (Taylor and Francis, printers). xiii + 497 pp. + Plates I-XXIV. (Anolis richardii, pp. 37–38).
Duméril, A.M.C.; Bibron, G. (1837). Erpétologie générale ou Histoire naturelle complète des Reptiles. Tome quatrième. [= General Herpetology or Complete Natural History of the Reptiles. Volume 4 ]. Paris: Librairie Encyclopédique de Roret. 571 pp. + errata et emendanda. ("Anolis Richardii ", new species, pp. 141–142). (in French).
Nicholson, Kirsten E.; Crother, Brian I.; Guyer, Craig; Savage, Jay M. (2012). "It is time for a new classification of anoles (Squamata: Dactyloidae)". Zootaxa 3477: 1-108. (Dactyloa richardii, new combination).
Schwartz, A.; Thomas, R. (1975). A Check-list of West Indian Amphibians and Reptiles. Carnegie Museum of Natural History Special Publication No. 1. Pittsburgh, Pennsylvania: Carnegie Museum of Natural History. 216 pp. ("Anolis richardi [sic]", p. 98).

Anoles
Lizards of the Caribbean
Fauna of Grenada
Fauna of Saint Vincent and the Grenadines
Reptiles of Trinidad and Tobago
Reptiles described in 1837
Taxa named by André Marie Constant Duméril
Taxa named by Gabriel Bibron